Harper High School may refer to:

Harper High School (Chicago, Illinois), Chicago, Illinois
Harper School (Oregon), a K-12 school in Harper, Oregon
Harper High School (Texas), Harper Texas

See also
Harper School (disambiguation)